Viktoria Winge (born 5 March 1980) is a Norwegian actress. She is the daughter of actor and director Stein Winge and actress and singer Kari Onstad.

Selected filmography

References

External links

1980 births
Living people
Norwegian film actresses
Actresses from Oslo